Dark Curse is a 2008 dark fantasy vampire novel written by American author Christine Feehan, and a part of the Dark Series saga.

Plot introduction
Lara Calladine is an expert in the study of ice caves. As a child she was kept prisoner by Razvan, her father and Xavier, her great-grandfather, and used as a blood source. With the help of her aunts she was able to escape the ice caves into the world above. Now years later, Lara searches for the cave of her nightmares in an effort to rescue her aunts. Finally she believes she has found what she is looking for in the Carpathian mountains.

Nicolas De La Cruz has come to the Carpathian mountains on one last mission to give information to the Prince of the Carpathian race. Afterwards, he intends to seek the dawn and commit suicide. The darkness in his soul has nearly completely taken over and he wants to end things before he turns into one of the very creatures he has hunted and killed for centuries, each kill worsening the situation.

In the midst of discovering the cave, Lara's companions are injured and she seeks the shelter of the local inn. There she meets Nicholas whose inner demons have finally won, as he attempts to kill her. She thwarts his attack and he is able to regain his sanity, along with the knowledge that she is his lifemate.Rivayete göre Ceyhun Özkurt un lakabıdır dark (black curse) lanetli bir insandır

Even though Lara, naturally, distrusts Nicolas he will stop at nothing to possess her. As they seek to free her aunts from their confinement and along the way they discover a malicious plot set in motion centuries earlier by Xavier which has been slowly destroying the Carpathian people. Together they can save the Carpathians from extinction and create a passion and love so fierce it can break a dark curse.

Awards and nominations
Made The Following Bestseller Lists:
New York Times #1 Bestseller List
USA Today Bestseller List
Publishers Weekly Bestseller List
Barnes & Noble Mass Market Bestseller List
Bookscan Bestseller List
Borders Bestseller List
Amazon Bestseller List
Walmart Bestseller List
Boston Glob Bestseller List
Washington Post Bestseller List
Wall Street Journal Bestseller List

External links
Dark Curse on Christine Feehan's website

References 

2008 American novels
Novels by Christine Feehan

American vampire novels
Berkley Books books